The Yucatan brown brocket (Odocoileus pandora) is a small species of deer native to Central America.

Taxonomy
It has been previously treated as a disjunct subspecies of the gray brocket (Mazama gouazoubira) or a subspecies of the red brocket (M. americana). In 2021, the American Society of Mammalogists placed it in the genus Odocoileus.

Description
Among other features, the Yucatan brown brocket differs from both the red brocket and the gray brocket in the shape and measurements of the skull and antlers. It also differs from the Central American red brocket (M. temama) which is locally sympatric with the Yucatan brown brocket, in its gray-brown, rather than overall reddish, color.

Distribution and habitat 
O. pandora is found in the Yucatán Peninsula of Mexico, Belize and Guatemala. While it is found in humid tropical forest like most other brocket deer, the Yucatan brown brocket also ranges across arid, relatively open habitats.

References

Odocoileus
Ungulates of Central America
Mammals of Mexico
Mammals described in 1901
Taxa named by Clinton Hart Merriam
Taxobox binomials not recognized by IUCN 
Fauna of the Yucatán Peninsula